Arnold William Rodgers (5 December 1923 – October 1993) was an English professional footballer who made over 230 Football League appearances in the years after the Second World War in a career for Huddersfield Town, Bristol City and Shrewsbury Town.

Rodgers had initially played for Huddersfield as a guest in 1942, before he signed on full-time in 1946. After Shrewsbury Town he moved to Somerset where he was manager for non-league clubs Welton Rovers, which he helped to two losing first round appearances in the FA Cup (in 1964-65 and 1967-68), and Bath City from 1967 to 1971.

Following retirement from football he ran a business in Bristol as a florist for 37 years until he died of a heart attack in October 1993, aged 69.

References

 

1923 births
1993 deaths
English footballers
Footballers from Rotherham
Association football forwards
English Football League players
Huddersfield Town A.F.C. players
Bristol City F.C. players
Shrewsbury Town F.C. players